Cordyline murchisoniae, known as the dwarf palm lily is an evergreen Australian plant. A shrub to 6 metres tall. The range of distribution is coastal Queensland rainforests.

Leaves wavy edged, lanceolate in shape.  long on thin stems. Flowering occurs in spring; being white, reddish or lilac in colour. Fruit is a red berry. Suited to gardens with moist soils in semi shade to full shade. It is not frost tolerant. A bird attracting plant.

References 

murchisoniae
Asparagales of Australia
Flora of Queensland
Garden plants
Taxa named by Ferdinand von Mueller